Upper East Fork Cabin No. 29, also known as Upper East Fork Patrol Cabin and East Fork Cabin, is a log shelter in the National Park Service Rustic style in Denali National Park.  The cabin is part of a network of shelters for patrolling park rangers throughout the park.  It is a standard design by the National Park Service Branch of Plans and Designs and was built in  1929 by the Alaska Road Commission as a shelter for crews working on the trans-park road, one of four shelters built at ten-mile intervals along the road. The cabin was used by Adolph Murie as a base for his program of wolf observation in 1940 and 1941.

References

External links

Buildings and structures in Denali Borough, Alaska
Ranger stations in Denali National Park and Preserve
Park buildings and structures on the National Register of Historic Places in Alaska
Historic American Buildings Survey in Alaska
Log cabins in the United States
Rustic architecture in Alaska
Buildings and structures on the National Register of Historic Places in Denali Borough, Alaska
Log buildings and structures on the National Register of Historic Places in Alaska
1929 establishments in Alaska
National Register of Historic Places in Denali National Park and Preserve